Kelli is a former village in the Drama regional unit, Greece.

References

Former populated places in Greece
Drama (regional unit)